Maninder Sidhu  (born April, 1984) is a Canadian politician who was first elected to represent the riding of Brampton East in the House of Commons of Canada in the 2019 Canadian federal election. He won again in the 2021 election, by a widened margin.

Sidhu has served as a member of the Standing Committee on Natural Resources and the Standing Committee on Transport, Infrastructure and Communities. He is also an active member of several parliamentary associations and interparliamentary groups, including the Canada-Africa Parliamentary Association, the Canada-Europe Parliamentary Association, and the Canadian Section of ParlAmericas.

Sidhu lives with his wife and children in Brampton, where he has resided for the past 30 years.

Parliamentary Secretary 

On March 19, 2021, Sidhu became Parliamentary Secretary to the Minister of International Development.

Electoral record

References

External links

1984 births
Living people
Liberal Party of Canada MPs
Members of the House of Commons of Canada from Ontario
Politicians from Brampton